Ivica Mavrenski (born 31 March 1966) is a Serbian professional basketball coach and former player.

Playing career 
A point guard, Mavrenski played for Vojvodina, Profikolor, Crvena zvezda, FMP, Hemofarm, MZT Skopje, Gračanica, Gračanica, Ibon Nikšić, and ZTE KK.

National team career 
In July 1983, Mavrenski was a member of the Yugoslavia cadet national team that won a gold medal at the FIBA Europe Championship for Cadets in Tübingen and Ludwigsburg, West Germany. Over seven tournament games, he averaged 18.4 points per game leading a team as the top scorer. In August 1983, Mavrenski was a member of the Yugoslavia Juniors that finished 8th at the FIBA Under-19 World Championship in Palma de Mallorca, Spain. Over six tournament games, he averaged 2.7 points per game.

In August 1984, Mavrenski was a member of the Yugoslavia junior national team that won a bronze medal at the European Championship for Junior Men in Huskvarna and Katrineholm, Sweden. Over seven tournament games, he averaged 7.1 points per game.

Coaching career 
After retirement as a player, Mavrenski started with coaching career. He coached Vojvodina, Vizura, Železničar Inđija among others.

Career achievements 
 Yugoslav League champion: 1 (with Crvena zvezda: 1993–94)
 Yugoslav B League champion: 1 (with Vojvodina: 1987–88)
 YUBA B League champion: 1 (with Hemofarm: 1997–98)
 Yugoslav Super Cup winner: 1 (with Crvena zvezda: 1993)

References

External links
 Coach Profile at eurobasket.com
 Player Profile at fibaeurope.com
 Player Profile at eurobasket.com

1966 births
Living people
Basketball League of Serbia players
KK Crvena zvezda players
KK FMP (1991–2011) players
KK Hemofarm players
KK MZT Skopje players
KK Profikolor players
KK Sutjeska players
KK Vojvodina coaches
KK Vojvodina players
KK Vizura coaches
KK Železničar Inđija coaches
Serbian men's basketball coaches
Serbian expatriate basketball people in Hungary
Serbian expatriate basketball people in North Macedonia
Serbian expatriate basketball people in Montenegro
Serbian expatriate basketball people in the Czech Republic
Serbian men's basketball players
Sportspeople from Zrenjanin
ZTE KK players
Point guards